Felicisimo Ampon (October 27, 1920 – October 7, 1997) was a tennis player from the Philippines. He is considered to be the greatest Filipino tennis player in history, and at only 5 foot 3 inches tall, though closer to 4 ft 11, was once considered the best tennis player in the world, pound for pound.

He represented the country in several Davis Cup competitions for almost 30 years, and holds the Philippine all-time record for the most singles (34-26) and total wins (40-35) in Davis Cup history. He was known for winning the 1934 Far Eastern Games tennis gold medal, the 1950 Pan American Games tennis singles gold medal, the 1958 Asian Games tennis doubles gold medal, and 1968 Chinese Recreational Club Open Tennis doubles title.

Career

Felicisimo Ampon  was the son of former tennis player Felix Ampon and the brother of Desideria Ampon, who at her time dominated women's tennis in Asia.

Ampon made a good start of his career in the Far Eastern Games, winning the tennis singles gold medal in the 1934 edition. He twice played in the Philippines Amateur Tennis Championships and was beaten in the play-offs on both occasion. In 1936, he lost to eventual finalist Juanito Gavia in the quarterfinals. In 1937, he defeated Sam Ang and Alfredo Diy, and made it to the finals of the Philippines Championship but lost to Leonardo Gavia Jr. After a disappointing Philippines Championships campaign, Ampon bounced back.

After the war, Ampon made history by winning the Wimbledon Plate Championship in 1948, a trophy for the 96 players who made an early exit in the first and second rounds of the Wimbledon Championships.

In 1948 he won an International tournament in Copenhagen, Denmark, in 1949 he won Welsh Championships singles title, defeating South African Syd Levy in the final, the Bristol Championships, again defeating Levy in the final, and in 1951 he became the singles champions at the Swedish Hard Court Championships on clay after defeating Deyro on the final. Ampon participated in the 1950 Pan American Tennis Championships in Mexico City and won the singles event, his finest career title. Defeating Davis Cup legend Bill Talbert (USA) in the semi-finals and two-time Grand Slam finalist Tom Brown (USA) in the finals. That victory, earned Ampon the first ever Philippines Sportswriters Association (PSA) Athlete of the Year award in 2000.

In 1952, Ampon made it to the quarter-finals of the French Open at Roland Garros but narrowly lost to world number one Frank Sedgman (AUS) he reached the final of the Scottish Championships losing to Ian Ayre. In 1953, he returned to Roland Garros and made impact, defeating the 1950 champion Budge Patty (USA) in the fourth round before losing to eventual champion Ken Rosewall (AUS) in the quarter-finals. Both quarter-finals was the highest finished by a Filipino in Grand Slam tennis. He also becomes the shortest player ever to play in Wimbledon history and won over 30 European trophies throughout his career. The same year Ampon lost an all-Filipino final in Oslo, Norway, to Reymundo Deyro, arguably his greatest rival and partner in Philippine tennis history.

In 1958 Asian Games, he was defeated again by Deyro in the finals of men's singles tennis and finished with a silver medal. He then partnered with Deyro to capture the men's doubles gold medal and with his sister Desideria Ampon captured the mixed doubles bronze medal.

In the Davis Cup he went on to lead the country in the Eastern Zone for more than a decade and made a prolific partnerships with other Filipino tennis legends Raymundo Deyro, Johnny Jose and Cesar Carmona.

Ampon represented his country for the last time in 1968. He ended his Davis Cup career holding the Philippine record for the most singles (34-26) and total wins (40-35) in history. He also won his last title, teaming up with Hong Kong's Kenneth Tsui to capture the Chinese Recreational Club (CRC) Open men's double title.

Achievements

Singles events
 1934 Far Eastern Games champion (gold)
 1936 Philippines Amateur Tennis Championship, quarter-finalist
 1937 Philippines Amateur Tennis Championship, finalist
 1937 Davis Cup singles champion
 1940 Philippine Indoors champion
 1946 Pennsylvania Clay Courts champion
 1948 Wimbledon Plate champion
 1948 Copenhagen International (clay) champion
 1948 Midland Counties Championships champion
 1949 Welsh Championships champion
 1949 Philippine Indoors champion
 1949 West of England Championships champion
 1949 Beerschot champion
 1950 Pan American Championships champion
 1950 Indian International Championships champion
 1950 All India Championships champion
 1950 Northern India Championships champion
 1950 Philippines Championships finalist
 1950 Madrid finalist
 1951 Eastern Mediterranean Tennis Championship (Athens-Greece) champion
 1951 International Championships of Egypt - Cairo finalist
 1951 British Hard Court Championships finalist
 1952 French Open, quarter-finalist
 1952 Scottish Championships finalist
 1953 French Open, quarter-finalist
 1958 Asian Games men's singles, 2nd place (silver)

Doubles events
 1958 Asian Games men's doubles champions (gold) with Reymundo Deyro

Mixed events

 1951 Eastern Mediterranean Tennis Championship (Athens-Greece) finalist with Beryl Bartlett
 1958 Asian Games mixed doubles, 3rd place (bronze) with Desideria Ampon

Team events
 1957 Davis Cup Eastern Zone champion
 1958 Davis Cup Eastern Zone champion
 1960 Davis Cup Eastern Zone champion
 1964 Davis Cup Eastern Zone champion

References

External links
 
 

1920 births
1997 deaths
Asian Games gold medalists for the Philippines
Asian Games silver medalists for the Philippines
Asian Games bronze medalists for the Philippines
Asian Games medalists in tennis
Filipino male tennis players
Medalists at the 1958 Asian Games
Sportspeople from Manila
Tennis players at the 1958 Asian Games
Philippine Sports Hall of Fame inductees
Filipino expatriates in the United States